Daphnella magnifica is a species of sea snail, a marine gastropod mollusc in the family Raphitomidae.

Description
The length of the shell varies between 7 mm and 21 mm.

Distribution
This marine species was found off Cebu, Bohol & Balicasag, Philippines.

References

 Stahlschmidt P., Poppe G.T. & Chino M. (2014) Description of seven new Daphnella species from the Philippines (Gastropoda: Raphitomidae). Visaya 4(2): 29-38 page(s): 34.

External links
 Gastropods.com: Daphnella magnifica

magnifica
Gastropods described in 2014